William L. Johansen (1915 – September 5, 1941), also known as Frank or Harry W. Gordon, was an American serial killer who murdered three women, including his first wife, in New York and California between 1933 and 1940. He was arrested soon after his final murder, and executed by gas chamber at the San Quentin State Prison the following year.

Personal life 
In 1915, Johansen was born in Denmark and moved to Beverly, Massachusetts, at an early age. After finishing eighth grade, he briefly served in the Army. As an adult, he moved to New York City and worked various jobs at theaters and restaurants, the latter he received three years' probation for embezzling from. He once worked in a hospital morgue, where he began having urges about cutting people. His urges intensified when he drank whiskey, and he often slept with corpses there. Johansen later married a woman named Florence, and they had two children together. However, the marriage deteriorated, and the couple separated.

Murders 
At midnight on October 20, 1933, Johansen, after having an argument with Florence, grabbed her by the throat and choked her until she died. He proceeded place her corpse on a bed and cut open her abdomen with a boning knife to see if she was pregnant, which she claimed to be. Investigators thought she killed herself in Seppuku fashion, so her death was ruled a suicide. Johansen assumed the alias of Harry W. Gordon and left New York to work as a sea merchant. Eighteen months later, he arrived in San Francisco.On April 6, 1935, Johansen solicited Lena Betty Coffin, a 35-year-old prostitute, on Market Street. The two went to a nearby motel and he secured a room. One hour later, he grabbed her by the throat and strangled her into semiconsciousness. Afterwards, he taped her mouth shut to stop her from screaming and stabbed her to death. He then cleaned the room of fingerprints and other evidence before returning to his job. He soon headed the Portland, and spent a substantial amount of time on the Gulf of Mexico and in Texas. However, he eventually returned to California and married Lydia Gordon, a woman who ran a flower shop in Long Beach.

On June 24, 1940, Johansen met Robert Earl "Irene" McCarthy at a beer hall on Fifth Street. They drank together and both were fairly intoxicated. The two went to a nearby hotel after he bought a bottle of Whiskey, and he registered a room under "Mr. and Mrs. J. Wilkins of Los Angeles." Upon entering the room, McCarthy undressed and went to sleep. Johansen tried to arouse her, but she would not wake up, so he strangled her to death with her own girdle. He proceeded cut off a portion of her torso with a knife and place it near her corpse. He then threw her body off the bed, turned over the mattress to hide the bloodstains, and washed himself before leaving the hotel. Later that day, he took a bus to Los Angeles.

Other possible victims 
Johansen was also investigated in connection to the Cleveland Torso Murderer, an unidentified serial killer who murdered 12 people in Ohio between 1934 and 1938, due to the similar ways they mutilated and dismembered their victims. Police also suspected him of several unsolved killings in San Diego. However, he was never charged with any of these murders.

Imprisonment and execution

Capture and trial 

After McCarthy's murder, detectives investigated local bars and found a witness who had seen them together and knew Johansen's alias. Police arrested him in Los Angeles on July 9, 1940, as he walked out of a meeting. Employees of the hotel identified him as the man last seen with McCarthy, and he subsequently confessed to Coffin's and McCarthy's murders. He then revealed his true identity, and told them how he murdered his first wife. Johansen was charged with the two California murders. Although he wanted to plea guilty, his public defender would not allow him to, so he instead pleaded innocent. However, Johansan again changed his plea from innocent to not guilty by reason of insanity. Believing he was insane, he sought confinement in asylum, once telling the judge, "I'll kill some other woman if you free me. I'll do it again, sure!"

In October 1940, he was found legally sane and automatically convicted of the murders. One day later, he was sentenced to death. He was apathetic towards the verdict, telling the judge, "it doesn't make any difference."

Execution 
On September 5, 1941, Johansen was executed by gas chamber at the San Quentin State Prison. He had previously told reporters that he did not care about his upcoming execution, stating, "I don't give a damn if I go to the gas house. Not much doubt I'm a menace. I've killed three women and I'd probably do it again unless they get me out of the way. I expect the worst, and the sooner it comes the better."

References

External links 

 People v. Johansen (1941)

Date of birth unknown
1941 deaths
20th-century American criminals
20th-century executions by California
People executed by California by gas chamber
20th-century executions of American people
American male criminals
Executed American serial killers
Male serial killers
Violence against women in the United States
American people of Danish descent
People convicted of murder by California
Executed American serial killers
American merchants
1933 murders in the United States
1935 murders in the United States
1940 murders in the United States
Crimes against sex workers in the United States
Uxoricides
Deaths by strangulation in the United States
Deaths by stabbing in California
1915 births